Henry Joseph Finlay (died 1959) was an Irish politician. He was elected as a Cumann na nGaedheal Teachta Dála TD for the Roscommon constituency at the 1923 general election. He resigned on 30 October 1924 and the subsequent by-election held on 11 March 1925 was won by Martin Conlon of Cumann na nGaedheal.

References

Year of birth missing
1959 deaths
Cumann na nGaedheal TDs
Members of the 4th Dáil
Politicians from County Roscommon